Latin Extended-C is a Unicode block containing Latin characters for Uighur New Script, the Uralic Phonetic Alphabet, Shona, Claudian Latin and the Swedish Dialect Alphabet.

Block

History
The following Unicode-related documents record the purpose and process of defining specific characters in the Latin Extended-C block:

See also 
Phonetic symbols in Unicode

References 

Latin-script Unicode blocks
Unicode blocks